Mantas Ruikis (born June 28, 1985) is a Lithuanian professional  basketball player who plays as a shooting guard for BC Gargždai-SC of the Lietuvos krepšinio lyga (LKL).

On 31 August 2005, Mantas Ruikis left Neptūnas after playing four seasons with the team. After five seasons, on 12 November 2010, he returned to Neptūnas.

Achievements 
 2005 year: U-20 European championship vice champion
 2006 year: Baltic Basketball League Bronze medal
 2006 year: LSKL Champion
 2007 year: LKL three point shoot-out vice champion
 2006, 2007, 2008 years: LKL Bronze medal

References

External links 
 Mantas Ruikis profile LKL.lt (Lithuanian and English)
 Mantas Ruikis profile BBL.net (English)

1985 births
Living people
BC Neptūnas players
BC Pieno žvaigždės players
BC Šiauliai players
CB Valladolid players
Denain Voltaire Basket players
Lithuanian expatriate basketball people in France
Lithuanian expatriate basketball people in Spain
Lithuanian men's basketball players
Basketball players from Klaipėda
Shooting guards